How to Seduce a Playboy (German: Bel Ami 2000 oder Wie verführt man einen Playboy?) is a 1966 Austrian-Italian comedy film directed by Michael Pfleghar and starring Peter Alexander, Antonella Lualdi and Scilla Gabel.

The film's sets were designed by the art director Hertha Hareiter. Location shooting took place in Paris, Rome and Tokyo.

Synopsis
Every year the men's magazine selects a Playboy of the Year, but due to a computer error a shy accountant is chosen by mistake. As he has already been announced as the winner, the magazine decides to build up his public persona to justify their choice. While engaging on a tour of cities, he is pursued by a female journalist convinced that he is a fraud who should be exposed.

Cast
 Peter Alexander as Peter Knolle
 Antonella Lualdi as Vera
 Scilla Gabel as Anita Bionda
 Helga Anders as Lucy
 Linda Christian as Lucy's Mother
 Jocelyn Lane as Ginette
 Eliane D'Almeida as Coco
 Christiane Rücker as Millie
 Joachim Teege as Emile
 Georg Corten as Director Zwerch
 Otto Ambros as Schladitz
 Renato Salvatori as 	Boy Schock
 Joachim Fuchsberger as Sokker

References

Bibliography 
 Von Dassanowsky, Robert. Austrian Cinema: A History. McFarland, 2005.

External links 
 

1966 films
Austrian comedy films
Italian comedy films
1966 comedy films
1960s German-language films
Films directed by Michael Pfleghar
Constantin Film films
Films set in Paris
Films set in Rome
Films shot in Paris
Films shot in Rome
1960s Italian films